Ankolvadi Gir is a village in the Talala, Gujarat taluka and Gir Somnath district in the west of Gujarat, India.  it had a population near 15,000. the village is located at a hill, and it has a natural atmosphere. The people of Ankolwadi Gir are mostly connected to the business of KESAR MANGO farming. Ankolwadi Gir is located near Jungle of Gir, therefore lions and leopards come to the village for hunting often. It is an attractive place for planning a holiday because of its atmosphere and other attractions like jungle and lion

References

Villages in Gir Somnath district